Stare Biskupice may refer to:

 Stare Biskupice, Lubusz Voivodeship, Poland
 Stare Biskupice, Masovian Voivodeship, Poland

See also 
 Nowe Biskupice (disambiguation)
 Biskupice (disambiguation)